The National Alternative Movement is a political party in Moldova. It was created at the end of December 2021. The party is led by Chișinău Mayor Ion Ceban.

The party is in opposition to the current government of the Republic of Moldova.

Ideology 
Ion Ceban argues that the doctrine of the MAN party "is social-democratic according to the European type", and the formation proposes to make European integration a national idea.

Since the beginning of the Russian invasion of Ukraine, it has been noticed that Ceban switched to pro-European rhetoric, but Ceban continues to be called a pro-Russian politician.

History 
Speculation about disagreements between Ion Ceban and the Party of Socialists of the Republic of Moldova began in 2021. In the same year, politician Renato Usatîi said that Ceban would leave the Socialist Party and join a centre-right party.

Finally, in December 2021, Ceban announced the creation of the National Alternative Movement.

On 22 December 2022, the founding congress of the party was held.

Ceban officially announced the registration of the party on 17 January 2023.

References

2022 establishments in Moldova
Political parties established in 2022
Political parties in Moldova
Social democratic parties in Moldova